The 2014–15 season was the 114th season of competitive association football and the 88th season in the Football League played by Tranmere Rovers Football Club, a professional football club based in Birkenhead, Wirral. The results on the final day of the 2013–14 season meant Tranmere were relegated from League One and were to spend this season in League Two for the first time since promotion from it in 1988–89. On 11 August, former Football Association chief executive and ex-Tranmere Rovers player Mark Palios and his wife Nicola took a controlling interest in the club from outgoing chairman Peter Johnson.

On 27 May 2014, Rob Edwards was appointed as the new manager replacing Ronnie Moore, who was suspended in the middle of February 2014 for breaching FA rules. The summer transfer window saw twelve players join the club, including experienced striker Kayode Odejayi while Ryan Lowe left the club shortly after being handed the Player of the Season award. Edwards was sacked after just five months following the home loss to Plymouth Argyle which saw Tranmere Rovers at the bottom of League Two. Three days later Micky Adams was announced as new manager. A brief improvement in results which saw Tranmere reach the Third Round of the FA Cup and move out of the relegation zone was followed by disastrous spring form resulting in Adams leaving Tranmere by mutual consent two games before the end of the season, with the club again bottom of the table. Assistant manager Alan Rogers took charge, but on 25 April Tranmere was defeated at Plymouth Argyle which confirmed Rovers' relegation to the National League one round prior to the end of the season. Thus, Tranmere Rovers' ninety-four-year presence in the Football League had ended.

The season saw forty-eight players make at least one appearance in nationally organised first-team competition, including 24 players joining on loan. Max Power participated in fifty-three matches missing only one game, and he finished as leading scorer with thirteen goals.

Background and pre-season

Tranmere Rovers ended the previous season with John McMahon as caretaker manager after manager Ronnie Moore was suspended by the club in the middle of February 2014 for breaching FA rules against betting on competitions in which his club were involved. On 6 May, 42-year old Jamaican international Ian Goodison ended his ten-year stay at Prenton Park in which he made 410 appearances and won the Player of the Season accolade three times. Also, experienced forward Jean-Louis Akpa Akpro was released. On the same day, the club offered new contracts to five players, though finally only veteran Jason Koumas agreed to sign a new one-year deal, while goalkeeper Jason Mooney, defender Ash Taylor and midfielders James Wallace and Steve Jennings left the club. Eleven players, including first-choice goalkeeper Owain Fôn Williams and Player of the Season 2013–14 Ryan Lowe already had contracts for the upcoming season. Despite that, on 19 May Lowe, whose request to sign a longer contract was refused by the club, was transferred to division rivals Bury for an undisclosed fee.

On 27 May, 41-year old former Welsh international Rob Edwards was appointed new Tranmere Rovers manager with John McMahon staying at the club as assistant manager. It was the first managerial experience for Edwards, who had been an assistant at Exeter City previously. The next day, the first signing was made – 22-year old Welsh striker Eliot Richards signed a two-year contract. He was followed by his Bristol Rovers teammate midfielder Matthew Gill. Previously Gill had spent three seasons with Exeter, winning back-to-back promotions from the Conference National and League Two together with Edwards. Further Edwards signings were young central defender Michael Ihiekwe from Wolverhampton Wanderers, ex-Rotherham United striker Kayode Odejayi, 24-year old defender Marcus Holness from Burton Albion, Scottish midfielder Marc Laird released by Southend United and 30-year old defender Danny Woodards, while Evan Horwood cancelled his contract with Tranmere Rovers by mutual consent to return to Northampton Town, where he had spent end of the previous season on loan. On 4 August, ex-Tranmere Rovers player Joe Thompson had been signed by Bury. The midfielder was sidelined since November 2013 when he was diagnosed with a rare form of cancer. In June he was given the all-clear after completing a course of chemotherapy, but he had not been contacted to negotiate a new contract with Tranmere Rovers.

On 30 May, new home kits in the traditional all-white design were revealed for the upcoming season, while the existing away kits were retained.

Pre-season matches

Review

August
Tranmere Rovers started the season at home against the previous season's play-off semi-finalists York City. A ninety-fourth minute James Rowe goal earned Rovers a draw after Keith Lowe opened the scoring in the middle of the second half. Six players earned their first competitive caps for Rovers, while ex-Tranmere goalkeeper Jason Mooney took his place in York's starting line-up.

On 11 August, former Football Association chief executive and ex-Tranmere Rovers player Mark Palios and his wife Nicola took a controlling interest in the club from outgoing chairman Peter Johnson. Palios become Executive Chairman of the club, with Nicola as Vice-Chairman, and Johnson as Honorary President. This ended Johnson's 27-year spell as an owner, which counts the most successful period in the club's history due to three consecutive First Division play-off finishes in the early 90s and the 2000 Football League Cup Final. The next day assistant manager John McMahon left the club by mutual agreement as Rob Edwards wanted to make a change in his coaching department. Alex Russell, familiar to Edwards from playing at Exeter, joined Tranmere Rovers as the Club's new first team coach.

On 12 August, Tranmere were knocked out of the League Cup after a home defeat to the Championship side Nottingham Forest through a single first half goal. Rovers played with a numerical advantage for almost the whole second half after Michael Mancienne was sent off. In the next two games Tranmere was defeated by Shrewsbury Town 1–2 after two late goals and earned their first win and clean sheet at Wycombe Wanderers by scoring a goal either side of half-time. On 18 August, Edwards added to the squad with the first loan signing of the season, bringing young Saint Lucian defender Janoi Donacien over from Aston Villa until January 2015. Tranmere were defeated at home by Cheltenham Town 2–3 despite leading 2–0 at half-time. The first month of the season was concluded with a victory against 10-man Morecambe. Both goals were scored by Cole Stockton who extended his contract with Tranmere earlier that week till the summer of 2017.

September

On the final day of the summer transfer window, Tranmere Rovers signed Slovakian goalkeeper Peter Brezovan and bought ex-Rochdale striker George Donnelly for an undisclosed fee. Also, defender Hill signed a permanent deal after a successful contribution on a non-contract basis, though shortly after he suffered an Achilles tendon injury that ruled him out for six months. Tranmere was defeated 2–3 at Accrington Stanley, for the third time in the season losing the game after taking the lead. On 8 September, 33-year old Matthew Gill was named assistant manager. After goalless draws against Hartlepool United and Newport County, Tranmere was defeated by Exeter City and Carlisle United with former Rovers winger David Amoo scoring decisive goal for Carlisle.

October

Rovers' losing streak resumed in October with a loss at league leaders Bury. Tranmere finally scored a goal, which was only their second in seven games, in the League Trophy Second Round clash against Carlisle United. The game went to a shoot-out, won by Rovers 5–4 after Patrick Brough missed the sixth shot for the guests. On 11 October, after fourth consecutive league defeat at Plymouth Argyle, Tranmere Rovers reached the bottom of the League Two table with only nine points in 12 games. Two days later manager Rob Edwards had been sacked. On 16 November, ex-Port Vale manager Micky Adams was announced as his replacement, though the team was to be prepared for the next game by the assistant managers. Adams took charge after a fifth straight league defeat and announced the return to the club of Chris Shuker as assistant manager while Alex Russell left the club. Also, a double loan signing was made in order to strengthen the attack line: Armand Gnanduillet joined from Chesterfield and Danny Johnson signed from Cardiff City, while midfielder Steve Jennings, who was signed by Adams for Port Vale last summer, rejoined him at Tranmere on loan until January.

In the first game under Micky Adams Tranmere ended their losing streak after a goalless draw against Mansfield Town. It was followed by a 2–2 draw at Wimbledon, both Rovers goals were scored by Gnanduillet.

November
November started with a third draw in a row against Stevenage, with Jennings scoring a goal in the first game after his comeback. Ahead of the game, a bronze statue of Tranmere Rovers' most successful manager Johnny King was unveiled outside Prenton Park near the entrance to the Main Stand. The statue was funded by supporters and sculpted by Liverpool artist Tom Murphy.

On 3 November, assistant manager Matthew Gill left the club by mutual consent. Rovers defeated Bristol Rovers in the First Round of FA Cup thanks to a Max Power goal on 54th minute. Three days later Tranmere upheld their good cup form in the Football League Trophy with an away victory at Bury. After narrow defeats against Luton Town and Southend United, Tranmere finally achieved their first league victory under Micky Adams on 29 November against Portsmouth. The win was clouded by the serious injury of young loanee Will Aimson, who fractured both his tibia and fibula in a collision with teammate Danny Holmes. 17-year old defender Evan Gumbs made his first appearance for the senior team against Luton Town as a second-half substitute, following an injury to Josh Thompson who picked up a hamstring injury on his Tranmere debut.

December
On 6 December, Tranmere earned an FA Cup Second Round home replay after a draw at Oxford United thanks to a late Jason Koumas goal. The League Trophy area semifinal ended in another 2–2 draw against League One opponents Walsall. Rovers were one shot off the victory during the penalties but Liam Ridehalgh and Marc Laird misses cost Tranmere a place in Northern section final. A Max Power strike earned Tranmere victory in the next league game at Dagenham & Redbridge to climb out of the relegation zone. FA Cup replay brought Rovers another victory and a place in the Third Round thanks to Kayode Odejayi and Max Power goals. Tranmere almost hit a third consecutive league victory versus Cambridge United, but their 10-man rivals managed to equalise in the final minutes. The unbeaten run finally came to end with an away defeat to promotion contenders Burton Albion after Liam Ridehalgh was sent off following a foul in the penalty box in the middle of the first half. The game was also notable for the second Chris Shuker debut six months after he officially ended his career. The year was ended with a 2–1 home victory against relegation rivals Northampton Town. Good December form resulted in Micky Adams being nominated League Two Manager of the Month.

January

Tranmere started 2016 with the FA Cup defeat at Premier League team Swansea City in the Third round, conceding six goals.

Steve Jennings became the first signing of the winter transfer window, returning to Tranmere on a permanent basis, signing a six-month deal. He was followed by Northern Irish striker Rory Donnelly who joined on loan from Swansea City until the end of the season. At the same time, Adams announced five players as transfer listed – Antonie Boland, Eliot Richards, James Rowe, Abdulai Bell-Baggie and George Donnelly. On the next day former Tranmere defender Alan Rogers joined the Club's coaching staff. Defender Marcus Holness suffered serious knee ligament damage on 10 January that ruled him out until the end of the season. On 17 January, youth midfielder Mitch Duggan made his senior debut as a late substitute for Shamir Fenelon.

Rovers kept good league form at the end of January, defeating Accrington Stanley and Exeter City, hence losing only one league game in last nine. On-loan striker Rory Donnelly was nominated and then named Football League Two Player of the Month after scoring three goals in January. By 31 January, Tranmere climbed to 17th place, their highest since August, though above the relegation zone by only two points. Adams continued refreshing the squad by signing Canadian international striker Iain Hume, who returned to Tranmere after ten years, midfielders Rob Taylor and Lee Molyneux and defender Adam Dugdale.

February
Tranmere started February with a home loss to Carlisle United after two Charlie Wyke second half goals. Three days later Rory Donnelly scored his fourth goal for Tranmere at Newport County, but the hosts' late goal denied Rovers victory. Tranmere were defeated by relegation rivals for the second time in three matches, this time at York City after Wes Fletcher scored a goal either side of half-time. On 21 February Tranmere unexpectedly beat league leaders Shrewsbury Town 2–1 at Prenton Park as Donnelly scored his fifth goal for Rovers. On the next matchday Tranmere conceded three late goals at Portsmouth to give away a two-goal lead and lose the game. It was followed by another 0–2 defeat against close rivals Cheltenham Town.

March
Tranmere’s relegation worries took another turn for the worse as they suffered a fourth straight defeat to sink back into the bottom two after the home encounter against Dagenham & Redbridge that saw Rovers back in the relegation zone. On 14 March Tranmere's loss at Northampton Town after a single Ryan Cresswell goal became their fifth straight defeat. Three days later Tranmere broke the losing run with an away victory at Cambridge City, thanks to Dan Gardner and Max Power goals. Later, Tranmere was outplayed 1–4 by Burton Albion at Prenton Park, in the game that marked the senior debut of 17-year old midfielder Ben Jago. Young loanee George Green's goal scored in the ninety-fourth minute cancelled Adebayo Akinfenwa's first half goal to earn Tranmere Rovers one point against Wimbledon to end March in the relegation zone, one point off survival.

April and May

Paired Easter games saw the second 2–2 draw of the season against Stevenage and a narrow home defeat at Luton Town. Three more back-to-back defeats followed as Rovers failed to score in each of them. Finally, on 19 April, Micky Adams left Tranmere by mutual consent.  The team were bottom of the table but still had a chance to avoid relegation with the games against Plymouth Argyle and Bury to be played. Assistant manager Alan Rogers and Academy manager Shaun Garnett took temporary charge of the first team.

Max Power conceded a penalty scored by Reuben Reid early in the penultimate game of the season against Plymouth. He himself equalised the score inside the first half, but soon after Plymouth regained the lead through Tareiq Holmes-Dennis. With ten minutes remaining, the hosts doubled the lead and though Kayode Odejayi scored in the final minutes it was another Tranmere defeat. As Hartlepool United, since December led by former Tranmere Rovers manager Ronnie Moore, won their home game against Exeter City, Tranmere lost their last chance to remain in the Football League. In the final game of the season Alan Rogers gave teenager Tolani Omotola an opportunity to make his Football League debut as Bury won the game by a single Tom Soares goal, to win promotion to the League One.

League Two

League table

Results by matchday

Matches

FA Cup

Football League Cup

Football League Trophy

Players
Transfers, contract extensions and loans are listed from the last day of the previous season till the final day of this season

Transfers

Contract extensions

Loans

Season statistics

† Statuses are mentioned for youth academy players without senior contract and players who were signed on non-contract basis or on loan. Dates joined and left are mentioned only for players who changed club between the first and the last matchday of the season.

References

2014-15
2014–15 Football League Two by team